Robert Gordon "Porky" Brown (1927 – December 20, 1987) was an award-winning and all-star guard in the Canadian Football League.

A native of Victoria, Brown was winner of the 1950 Dr. Beattie Martin Trophy for Canadian rookie of the year in the west. He went on to a 10-season professional football career with the Calgary Stampeders (he sat out 1952) and was named an all-star in 1953.

References

1927 births
1987 deaths
Calgary Stampeders players
Canadian Football League Rookie of the Year Award winners
Players of Canadian football from British Columbia
Sportspeople from Victoria, British Columbia